The 1916 municipal election was held December 11, 1916 to elect a mayor and six aldermen to sit on Edmonton City Council, three trustees to sit on the public school board, and four trustees to sit on the separate school board.

There were ten aldermen on city council, but four of the positions were already filled: Orlando Bush, Robert Douglas, William Campbell McArthur, and Charles Wilson were all elected to two-year terms in 1915 and were still in office.  James Macfie MacDonald was also elected to a two-year term in 1915, but resigned; accordingly, J. A. Kinney was elected to a one-year term.

There were seven trustees on the public school board, while four of the positions were already filled: Walter Ramsey, Samuel Barnes, Henry Douglas, and J. A. McPherson had all been elected to two-year terms in 1915.  There were also seven positions on the separate board, with three of them filled.  Because one was vacant by reason of a resignation, O Derome was elected to a one-year term.

Electoral System
The election of mayor was conducted by First past the post.

The election of aldermen was conducted through Plurality block voting, with each voter having ability to cast as many as six votes, no more than one per candidate.

Voter turnout

There were 7745 ballots cast out of 11717 eligible voters, for a voter turnout of 66.1%.

Results

 bold or  indicates elected
 italics indicate incumbent
 "SS", where data is available, indicates representative for Edmonton's South Side, with a minimum South Side representation instituted after the city of Strathcona, south of the North Saskatchewan River, amalgamated into Edmonton on February 1, 1912.

Mayor

Aldermen
One Southsider had to be elected.

Under the minimum South Side representation rule, Grant was elected over Picard.

Public school trustees

Separate (Catholic) school trustees

References

Election History, City of Edmonton: Elections and Census Office

1916
1916 elections in Canada
1916 in Alberta